C Raymond Peters (born 29 October 1973 in Moreland, NY, United States), is an American International motorcycle trials rider. Peters won the NATC Expert National Championship ten times between 2004 and 2014. Peters is the current Beta USA Trials team Manager.

Peters is currently team manager for the US Beta trials team.

Biography
In 1990 Peters won the NATC High School class and moved straight into the Pro class the following season.
After moving up from the High School class, Peters put on a good performance in 1991, ending the season a creditable 9th place with a best of 5th in Pennsylvania.

In 1992 he finished 6th in the series and was named as part of the US Trial des Nations team alongside Geoff Aaron, Cory Pincock and Ryan Young, to compete in the international event being held this year at Watkins Glen, Peters' home state. Against the best riders in the world the team came home in 9th place.

Peters became established as a front runner in the NATC Pro class, and proved this by finishing 3rd in the 1993 series behind Young and Aaron, posting three runner-up finishes during the season. Once again named a member of the US Trial des Nations team Peters competed in Ireland.

1994 was almost a carbon copy of the previous year, producing another 3rd place overall for the season, though this time it was Geoff Aaron who won the title with Ryan Young just ahead of Peters.

After securing 5th place in the national series, Peters was once again off overseas to compete in the Trial des Nations event of 1995, this year held in Piesting, Austria. The US team, consisting of Peters, Geoff Aaron, Jess Kempkes and Matt Moore finished in 4th place out of the 13 countries in the International Trophy event.
He also won the annual Rocky Mountain Trials Association Ute Cup event.

A landmark year in 2014 produced a season long battle with Andrew Putt and Alex Niederer which went all the way to the final round in Tennessee at the Sequatchie Trials Training Center. Peters won both Tennessee rounds and took the title from Putt by a mere five points, and with it gained his tenth NATC Expert championship.

National Trials Championship Career

Honors
 US National NATC Expert Trials Champion 2004, 2005, 2006, 2007, 2008, 2009, 2010, 2012, 2013, 2014
 US National NATC Sr. Expert Sportsman East Champion 2017
 US National NATC Sr. Expert Sportsman West Champion 2017
 US National NATC High School Champion 1990
 Member of winning USA Trial des Nations team 2000
 Ute Cup winner 1995, 1996, 1997, 2020

Related Reading
NATC Trials Championship
FIM Trial European Championship
FIM Trial World Championship

References 

1973 births
Living people
American motorcycle racers
Motorcycle trials riders